David Patrick Henige (born 1938) is an American historian, bibliographer, academic librarian and Africanist scholar. The majority of Henige's academic career has been spent in affiliation with the University of Wisconsin–Madison, where for over three decades he held the position of bibliographer in African studies at UW–Madison's Memorial Library.

Education 
As an undergraduate, Henige attended the University of Toledo, Ohio in the 1960s, obtaining first a B.A. then a master's degree in history. In 1973 he completed a PhD in African History in 1973 at the University of Wisconsin-Madison. Henige undertook Fieldwork towards his degree  in Ghana, West Africa. Henige's long association with the Memorial Library began during his PhD studies, when he worked for the library.

Career 
After completing his PhD, Henige taught for a year at the University of Birmingham's Centre of West African Studies, a research department established a decade earlier by the noted Africanist scholar John D. Fage.

Preferring the autonomy of a bibliographer to lecturing, Henige returned to Wisconsin in 1974 to take a position at the Memorial Library. He thereafter completed a master's degree in Library and information science in 1978. Henige was the founder and editor of the journal History in Africa from 1974 to 2010.

Henige has written several books and more than 170 scholarly papers in his major fields of interest, African studies and history, as  well as substantial contributions to historiography, librarianship, epistemology, the nature of oral history and myth, and critiques of historical methodologies.

Notes

References

External links
 

21st-century American historians
21st-century American male writers
American bibliographers
American librarians
American Africanists
University of Toledo alumni
University of Wisconsin–Madison College of Letters and Science alumni
Academics of the University of Birmingham
University of Wisconsin–Madison faculty
1938 births
Living people
American male non-fiction writers